The Suhrawardiyya is a Sufi order founded by Abu al-Najib Suhrawardi (died 1168). Lacking a centralised structure, it eventually divided into various branches. The order was especially prominent in India. The ideology of the Suhrawardiyya was inspired by Junayd of Baghdad (died 910) a Persian scholar and mystic from Baghdad.

Under the Ilkhanate (1256–1335), the Suhrawardiyya was one of the three leading Sufi orders, and was based in western Iran. The order had its own khanaqahs (Sufi lodges), which helped them spread their influence throughout Persianate culture and society. The order included prominent members such as the Akbarian mystics Abd al-Razzaq Kashani (died 1329) and Sa'id al-Din Farghani (died 1300), and the Persian poet Saadi Shirazi (died 1292).

Today most of the order has dissolved in some Middle Eastern countries such as Syria. The order is still active in Iraq, where it continues to recruit new members.

References

Sources
 
 
 

Sunni Sufi orders
Religion in Iraq